The Communauté de communes Avre Luce Moreuil  is a former communauté de communes in the Somme département and in the  Picardie région of France. It was created in December 1992. It was merged into the new Communauté de communes Avre Luce Noye in January 2017.

Composition 
This Communauté de communes comprised 23 communes:

Arvillers
Aubercourt
Beaucourt-en-Santerre
Berteaucourt-lès-Thennes
Braches
Cayeux-en-Santerre
Contoire
Démuin
Domart-sur-la-Luce
Fresnoy-en-Chaussée
Hailles
Hangard
Hangest-en-Santerre
Ignaucourt
La Neuville-Sire-Bernard
Le Plessier-Rozainvillers
Le Quesnel
Mézières-en-Santerre
Moreuil
Morisel
Pierrepont-sur-Avre
Thennes
Villers-aux-Érables

See also 
Communes of the Somme department

References 

Avre Luce Moreuil